The 2006 St Kilda Football Club season was the 110th in the club's history. Coached by Grant Thomas and captained by Luke Ball, they competed in the AFL's 2006 Toyota Premiership Season.

Standings

Players and staff

References

External links
 
Listing of St Kilda games in 2006

St Kilda Football Club seasons